The Vermont Green Party (VGP) or Vermont Greens formed in 2002 and was a state-level political party in Vermont. 

They were formed out of organizing around Ralph Nader's presidential campaigns in 1996 and 2000.  The VGP was one of two established state green parties that refused to place the 2004 national presidential nominee, David Cobb on its ballot line, endorsing Nader's independent campaign instead.  The party ran statewide and local candidates from 2002 to 2010, but was split by internal tensions and both factions dissolved by 2011 and were absorbed back into the Progressive Party

Statewide candidates

 While the national Green Party nominee in 2000, Nader ran on the Vermont Progressive Party ballot line.

The VGP endorsed the Progressive Party's Michael Badamo for Governor in 2002 and Ralph Nader's independent run in 2004.  Due to the breakup of the Vermont Green Party, Green presidential nominees, Cynthia McKinney in 2008 and Jill Stein in 2012, ran as write-in candidates in Vermont.

Local candidates

2004 election

The Burlington Green Party also ran candidates in 2007 and 2009.

References

External links
 Vermont Green Party website
 Facebook page (still active)

Green
Political parties established in 2002
Green Party of the United States by state
2002 establishments in Vermont